Guido Andreozzi and Guillermo Durán were the defending champions but chose not to defend their title.

Facundo Bagnis and Andrés Molteni won the title after defeating Orlando Luz and Rafael Matos 6–4, 5–7, [12–10] in the final.

Seeds

Draw

References

External links
 Main draw

Uruguay Open - Doubles
2019 Doubles